Peter Geoffrey Richardson (born 15 July 1950), is a British viola player and multi-instrumentalist best known for his work with Caravan, Murray Head and the Penguin Cafe Orchestra.

Career 
Richardson's father was a semi-pro musician. Richardson himself studied at Winchester School of Art. Richardson joined Spirogyra in 1972, but the band broke up shortly after and he joined Caravan on viola. In the mid-1970s, he diversified into session work, including with Kevin Ayers, Café Jacques, Penguin Cafe Orchestra, and The Buzzcocks. He left Caravan in 1978, but returned in 1980, playing on The Album.

Later in his career, he toured with Murray Head, Penguin Cafe Orchestra and Bob Geldof. He has also recorded with Murray Head, including Between Us (1979), Innocence (1993) and Pipe Dreams (1996).  He released a solo album, Viola Mon Amour, in 1993, followed by three albums with fellow Caravan band member Jim Leverton, Follow Your Heart (1995),  Poor Man's Rich Man (2000) and The End of The Pier Show (2006). In 2011 he released another solo album, Moving Up A Cloud, with Jo Hook, and in 2016 the first album for which he wrote the songs and performed the vocals, The Garden of Love.

As of 2016, Richardson continues to be an active member of Caravan, having toured in 2011 and performed on a cruise with the group in 2015.

Discography

Filmography 
 2015: Romantic Warriors III: Canterbury Tales (DVD)

References

External links 
 
 Calyx biography

Canterbury scene
English rock guitarists
English male guitarists
English violists
English multi-instrumentalists
1950 births
Living people
People from Hinckley
Caravan (band) members
Musicians from Leicestershire
Penguin Cafe Orchestra members